Chagha Sorkhak (also Romanized as Chaghā Sorkhak; also known as Chaghā Sorkheh) is a village in Haparu Rural District, in the Central District of Bagh-e Malek County, Khuzestan Province, Iran. At the 2006 census, its population was 419, in 67 families.

References 

Populated places in Bagh-e Malek County